The 2012 Dunlop V8 Supercar Series was an Australian motor racing competition for V8 Supercars. It was the thirteenth running of the V8 Supercar Development series.  Supporting the 2012 International V8 Supercars Championship, it began on 1 March at the Clipsal 500 and ended on 2 December at the Sydney 500 after seventeen races held over seven rounds. 2012 was the last year in which the Ford BF Falcon was eligible for the series.

The series was won by Scott McLaughlin driving a Ford FG Falcon.

Calendar
The series was contested over seven rounds at seven V8 Supercars Championship events.

Teams and drivers

The following teams and drivers contested the 2012 Dunlop V8 Supercar Series.

Points system
Series points were awarded at each race according to the following table:

Driver standings

References

External links
 2012 Operations Manual, www.v8supercars.com.au, as archived at web.archive.org
 2012 Development Series Event Calendar, www.v8supercars.com.au, as archived at web.archive.org 
 Dunlop Series Points, racing.natsoft.com.au, as archived at web.archive.org

Supercars Development Series
Dunlop V8 Supercar